Platyops sterreri is a species of crustacean in the family Mysidae, endemic to Bermuda, the only species in the genus Platyops.

See also
Bermudamysis

References

Mysida
Freshwater crustaceans of North America
Endemic fauna of Bermuda
Monotypic arthropod genera
Taxonomy articles created by Polbot